This uniform polyhedron compound is a chiral symmetric arrangement of six pentagonal prisms, aligned with the axes of fivefold rotational symmetry of a dodecahedron.

Related polyhedra 
This compound shares its vertex arrangement with four uniform polyhedra as follows:

References 
.

Polyhedral compounds